Slagelse Dream Team was a handball team from the town of Slagelse, Denmark. It is sometimes referred to as "Slagelse DT", and is the professional first team for the handball club Slagelse Forenede Håndboldklubber (Slagelse FH). The club was catapulted into the limelight in 2000 when Anja Andersen took the head coach job and in a very short time led the women's team to the first Danish victory in the Women's EHF Champions League final in 2004.

History 

Slagelse Forenede Håndboldklubber was created by a merger of the two clubs Slagelse HK and Marievang IF who each had their own success, especially on youth level. Slagelse HK's women's team was promoted twice to the premier division around 1990, though the team was relegated the following season on both occasions.

In 1997 the two clubs merged under the name Slagelse FH and in early 2000 the club signed a deal with Anja Andersen to help the club achieve promotion to the premier division.

Notable former players

  Camilla Andersen (2001–2004)
  Line Hovgaard (2004–2008)
  Rikke Hørlykke (2004–2006)
  Janne Kolling (2000–2001)
  Christina Krogshede (2006–2008)
  Anne Loft (2003–2008)
  Sofie Steffensen (2005–2007)
  Kamilla Kristensen (2001–2007)
  Mette Melgaard (2001–2008)
  Rikke Schmidt (2002–2005)
  Mia Hundvin (2001–2003)
  Cecilie Leganger (2005–2008)
  Ana Batinić (2005–2008)
  Anja Frešer (2003–2004)
  Katarina Bulatovic (2006–2007)
  Bojana Popović (2002–2007)
  Maja Savić (2004–2008)
  Ausra Fridrikas (2002–2005)
  Stéphanie Cano (2003–2004)
  Hong Jeong-ho (2000–2003)
  Valentina Radulovic (2003–2005)
  Carmen Lungu (2005–2007)
  Irina Poltoratskaya (2004–2006)
  Emiliya Turey (2005–2008)
  Anja Obradović (2006–2007)
  Svetlana Ognjenović (2007–2008)

Results 

Danish Championship:
Gold: 2003, 2005, 2007
Silver: 2004, 2006
Champions League:
Winner: 2004, 2005, 2007
EHF Cup:
Winner: 2003
EHF Champions Trophy:
Finalist: 2003, 2004 
Third place: 2007

External links 
Official Website
EHF Profile

Danish handball clubs
Slagelse Municipality